John Enright (born 1977) is an Irish hurling selector and former hurler who predominantly played for Tipperary Senior Championship club Thurles Sarsfields. He played for the Tipperary senior hurling team at various times over a six-year period, during which time he usually lined out as a right corner-forward.

Enright began his hurling career at club level with Thurles Sarsfields. He joined his older brother Eddie on the club's senior team as a 16-year-old in 1993 and, towards the end of his career in 2012, he won a Munster Club Championship medal. Enright was also part of four Tipperary Club Championship-winning teams, including as captain in 2009. He also lined out with the Éire Óg-Corrachoill club in the Kildare Club Championship, and was also selected for University College Cork, with whom he won three successive Fitzgibbon Cup titles.

At inter-county level, Enright was part of the Tipperary minor team that won the Munster Championship in 1993 before later lining out for three seasons with the Tipperary under-21 team. He joined the Tipperary senior team in 1996. Enright lined out with the senior team at various times over the following six years, however, he failed to secure a permanent place on the starting fifteen. He left the panel for the final time in 2002. Enright returned to inter-county hurling a decade later and won a National Hurling League medal in Division 2B with the Kildare senior hurling team.

He joined the Meath backroom team ahead of the 2021 season.

Honours
University College Cork
Fitzgibbon Cup (3): 1996, 1997, 1998

Thurles Sarsfields
Munster Senior Club Hurling Championship (1): 2012
Tipperary Senior Hurling Championship (4): 2005, 2009 (c), 2010, 2012

Tipperary
Munster Minor Hurling Championship (1): 1993

Kildare
National Hurling League Division 2B (1): 2012

References

1977 births
Living people
UCC hurlers
Thurles Sarsfields hurlers
Tipperary inter-county hurlers
Kildare inter-county hurlers
Alumni of University College Cork
Meath county hurling team